Paulianites nidicola is a species of beetle in the family Carabidae, the only species in the genus Paulianites.

References

Lebiinae